Marie of Prussia (October 15, 1825 – May 17, 1889) was Queen of Bavaria by marriage to Maximilian II of Bavaria, and the mother of Kings Ludwig II and Otto of Bavaria.

Life
Born and raised in Berlin, she was the daughter of Prince Wilhelm of Prussia, a younger brother of King Friedrich Wilhelm III of Prussia, and his wife, Landgravine Marie Anna of Hesse-Homburg. The family spent half of the year at Fischbach (today Karpniki) Castle in Silesia, where they loved to hike in the Giant Mountains. 

In her youth, Marie was seriously considered as a wife for Ernest II, Duke of Saxe-Coburg and Gotha, until her engagement to Maximilian was announced.

Queen

On 12 October 1842, she married the Crown Prince, and later King of Bavaria, Maximilian II.

Marie was loved equally by both the Catholic and Protestant populations. (At that time, Bavaria was mostly Catholic, whilst Prussia was mostly Evangelical.) A specific emphasis of her "great social engagement" was a reactivation of the Bavarian Women's Association, which took place on 18 December 1869 with the aid of her son, Ludwig II. Its aim was "Pflege und Unterstützung der im Felde verwundeten und erkrankten Krieger" (Care and support of soldiers wounded and injured in the field). The Bavarian Red Cross was officially founded as a result of the Bavarian Women's Association. The Red Cross eventually took over for the Queen.

Queen dowager
With the sudden death of Maximilian II on 10 March 1864, Marie became a widow. On 12 October 1874, she converted to Catholicism.

As a widow she lived at Nymphenburg Palace. She spent her summer holidays at Schloss Hohenschwangau near Füssen, a castle her husband had redecorated in Gothic Revival style, and at her country estate in Elbigenalp in the Lechtal Alps. She enjoyed hiking the mountains, which she had often done with her sons when they were young. Marie looked after her second son Otto, who was declared insane. She outlived her elder son, Ludwig II, by nearly three years; his unusual death occurring on 13 June 1886. He had not liked her very much (just as he disliked most of his other relatives) and had tried to avoid contact as far as possible. Marie died in 1889 in Hohenschwangau.

She is interred in the Theatine Church in Munich in a side chapel opposite her husband.

Issue

Ludwig II of Bavaria (25 August 1845 - 13 June 1886); succeeded as King of Bavaria as Ludwig II. Declared mentally incompetent without examination and deposed in a coup in favour of his uncle, Prince Luitpold, on 10 June 1886; died under disputed circumstances.
Otto I of Bavaria (27 April 1848 - 11 October 1916); succeeded as King of Bavaria as Otto I, but reigned only in name due to the regency of his uncle, Prince Luitpold. Declared mentally incompetent and deposed on 5 November 1913 by his cousin Prince Ludwig, later King Ludwig III of Bavaria.

Honours
 : Grand Mistress of the Order of Theresa
  Kingdom of Prussia:
 Dame of the Order of Louise, 1st Division
 Cross of Merit for Women and Girls
 : Dame of the Order of Queen Maria Luisa, 17 June 1856
 : Dame of the Order of Sidonia, 1871

Ancestry

References 

This article was translated from the article on the German Wikipedia on December 21, 2005.

1825 births
1889 deaths
People from Berlin
House of Hohenzollern
House of Wittelsbach
Bavarian queens consort
Converts to Roman Catholicism from Calvinism
German Roman Catholics
Burials at the Theatine Church, Munich
Queen mothers